"The Last of the Winnebagos" is a short story written by American writer Connie Willis.  It was first published in Asimov's Science Fiction Magazine in 1988, and reprinted in the short story collections Impossible Things (1994) and The Best of Connie Willis (2013).

Plot synopsis
The story, set in Arizona, takes place in a dystopian future where a pandemic called newparvo (a virulent strain of canine parvovirus) has killed all the dogs.  In the wake of this disaster the Humane Society, referred to somewhat ominously as "the Society", has been given enormous powers within the government. The story's main character, photojournalist David McCombe, is haunted because despite being a professional photographer, none of the dog portraits he had taken show the personality of the subjects, and of his own dog, Aberfan, he has no pictures at all.

Awards
 Hugo Award for best science fiction novella 1989
 Nebula Award for best science fiction novella 1988

External links 
 

1988 short stories
Science fiction short stories
Works originally published in Asimov's Science Fiction
Nebula Award for Best Novella-winning works
Hugo Award for Best Novella winning works
Works by Connie Willis
Arizona in fiction
Dystopian literature